Carol Giambalvo is a retired exit counselor who worked with Cult Awareness Network's New York office and chaired on the Cult Awareness Network's national board of directors from 1988–91, and also sits on the International Cultic Studies Association's board of directors heads its Recovery Programs, and is responsible for its outreach program. She co-founded reFOCUS, an anti-cult organization for ex-cult members in the United States.

She got into the profession when her stepdaughter became involved with ISKCON in 1978, The International Society for Krishna Consciousness.

She was based in Flagler Beach, Florida, when she was active as an exit counselor and cult educator.

Bibliography 

 "Post-cult Problems: An Exit Counselor's Perspective." in Recovery from Cults: Help for Victims of Psychological and Spiritual Abuse, edited by Michael D. Langone, 148–154. New York and London: W. W. Norton, 1995. Partially available online here.
 Exit Counseling: A Family Intervention. 2nd and rev. ed. Oxford and New York: Oxford University Press, 1992.
 "Book Review – Captive Hearts, Captive Minds: Freedom and Recovery from Cults and Other Abusive Relationships." Cultic Studies Journal 10, no. 1 (1993): 86–90.
 (With Joseph Kelly, Patrick Ryan, and Madeleine Landau Tobias) "Ethical Standards for Thought Reform Consultants." Cultic Studies Journal 13, no. 1 (1996): 95–106.
 (Edited with Herbert L. Rosedale) The Boston Movement: Critical Perspectives on the International Churches of Christ. 2nd rev. ed. Bonita Springs, Florida: American Family Foundation, 1997.

References

Year of birth missing (living people)
Living people
Exit counselors
Critics of new religious movements